German International School Boston (GISB) is a private, bilingual (German/English), international school in Boston, Massachusetts. This German school abroad was established in 2001 and officially inaugurated by Former German President Johannes Rau. The School's name changed from “German School Boston” to “German International School Boston.” The school moved to its current location in 2006. It serves over 300 students, ages 2.9 through grade 12. Students who complete the program receive the German International Abitur and a high school diploma.

In 2011, the Bundesverwaltungsamt (BVA) recognized GISB as an Exzellente Auslandsschule (German School Abroad of Excellence), the highest accreditation level awarded. GISB is recognized locally as an Affiliate Member of the Association of Independent Schools of New England. In the 2015–2016 school year, GISB was recognized as a STEM-friendly School and became part of a network of German schools with a STEM focus.

See also
 Bonn International School, an Anglo-American school in Bonn formed by the merger of two American schools and one British school
 German American

References

External links
 German International School Boston

2001 establishments in Massachusetts
Educational institutions established in 2001
German-American culture in Massachusetts
Boston
Elementary schools in Boston
High schools in Boston
Middle schools in Boston
Private high schools in Massachusetts